Philip Bourneuf (January 7, 1908 - March 23, 1979) was an American character actor who had a long stage career before appearing in films.

Early years 
The son of engineer Ambrose Bourneuf and his wife, the former Josephine Comeau, Bourneuf was born in Somerville, Massachusetts. He grew up in Melrose, Massachusetts. As a high school student, he performed in vaudeville and with local stock theater companies.

Career 
Bourneuf's obituary in The New York Times noted, "Mr. Bourneuf was included in the small circle of distinguished actors who appeared in the original casts of the American Repertory Theater, a group founded by Eva Le Gallienne, Margaret Webster, and Cheryl Crawford."

In the 1930s, Boruneuf acted as part of the Federal Theatre Project.

A founding member of the Actors Studio, one of Bourneuf's more memorable roles was as the district attorney who maneuvers the apparently innocent Dana Andrews into the electric chair in Beyond a Reasonable Doubt (1956). His last screen role was in the 1976 television mini-series Captains and the Kings.

Bourneuf made three guest appearances on Perry Mason. In 1960, he played Asa Culver in "The Case of the Prudent Prosecutor." In 1963 he played murder victim Edgar Thorne in "The Case of the Lawful Lazarus," and in 1965 he played defendant Victor Montalvo in "The Case of the Golden Girls."  He also appeared in other television series like Alfred Hitchcock Presents, Dr. Kildare and Gunsmoke (in the 1956 S3E1's "Legal Revenge", playing injured and bedridden murderer George Basset).

Personal life 
Bourneuf was married to actress Frances Reid from 1940 until their divorce in 1973. They had no children.

Death
On March 23, 1979, Bourneuf was found dead in his apartment in Santa Monica, California, at age 71.

Filmography

References

External links

1908 births
1979 deaths
American male film actors
American male stage actors
American male television actors
Male actors from Massachusetts
Burials at Westwood Village Memorial Park Cemetery
People from Somerville, Massachusetts
Male actors from Santa Monica, California
20th-century American male actors
20th-century American singers
Federal Theatre Project people